The Pab Formation is a Late Cretaceous geologic formation in Balochistan, in western Pakistan. It is dominated by sandstone, with minor mudstone and shale components. Dinosaur remains are among the fossils that have been recovered from the formation.

Fossil content 
Among the following fossils were reported from the formation:

Valid taxa 

 Isisaurus braincase, possible ulna
 ?Jainosaurus humerus

Invalid taxa 
 Balochisaurus
 Brohisaurus
 Gspsaurus
 Induszalim
 Khetranisaurus
 Khuzdarcroco
 Marisaurus
 Pabwehshi
 Pakisaurus
 Saraikisaurus
 Sulaimanisaurus
 Sulaimanisuchus
 Vitakridrinda

See also 
 List of dinosaur-bearing rock formations
 List of stratigraphic units with indeterminate dinosaur fossils

References

Bibliography 
  

Geologic formations of Pakistan
Upper Cretaceous Series of Asia
Maastrichtian Stage
Sandstone formations
Paleontology in Pakistan